The 2022–23 Columbia Lions men's basketball team represented Columbia University in the 2022–23 NCAA Division I men's basketball season. The Lions, led by sixth-year head coach Jim Engles, played their home games at Levien Gymnasium in New York City as members of the Ivy League. They finished the season 7–22, 2–12 in Ivy League play to finish in last place. They failed to qualify for the Ivy League tournament.

Previous season
The Lions finished the 2021–22 season 4–22, 1–13 in Ivy League play to finish in last place. Since only the top four teams qualify for the Ivy League tournament, they failed to qualify.

Roster

Schedule and results

|-
!colspan=12 style=""| Non-conference regular season

|-
!colspan=12 style=""| Ivy League regular season

Sources

See also
 2022–23 Columbia Lions women's basketball team

References

Columbia Lions men's basketball seasons
Columbia Lions
Columbia Lions men's basketball
Columbia Lions men's basketball